Mimoceps is a genus of bugs from Miridae family.

List of species
 Mimoceps insignis

References

Miridae genera
Stenodemini